OH (ohio) is the tenth studio album by American band Lambchop, released on October 6, 2008.

Track listing
 "Ohio"
 "Slipped, Dissolved and Loosed"
 "I'm Thinking of a Number (Between 1 and 2)"
 "National Talk Like a Pirate Day"
 "A Hold of You"
 "Sharing a Gibson with Martin Luther King, Jr."
 "Of Raymond"
 "Please Rise"
 "Popeye"
 "Close Up and Personal"
 "I Believe in You"

Special edition bonus disc
 "Please Rise"
 "Slipped, Dissolved and Loosed"
 "Chelsea Hotel #2"
 "Close Up"
 "Of Raymond"

References

2008 albums
Lambchop (band) albums
Merge Records albums